is a Japanese professional footballer who plays as a left or centre back for FC Imabari.

References

External links

1996 births
Living people
Japanese footballers
Association football defenders
FC Imabari players
Shonan Bellmare players
Montedio Yamagata players
Iwate Grulla Morioka players
J1 League players
J2 League players
J3 League players
Association football people from Okayama Prefecture
Sportspeople from Okayama